Cooma Tigers Football Club is an Australian semi-professional association football club based in Cooma, New South Wales. The club is affiliated with Capital Football and currently competes in the Community State Leagues Capital Football in the ACT. Cooma's home venue is Nijong Oval.

History
Cooma Football Club was formed in 1952 by the workforce of the Snowy Mountains Hydro Scheme which attracted people from all over the world to the Australian Alps. Cooma FC is one of the oldest continuous football clubs in Australia with a very proud tradition considering the small region in which it resides.

In 2014, Cooma won the league premiership for the first time in the club's sixty-three-year history. The Tigers defeated title rivals Belconnen United 3–0 at home to clinch the title.

In 2015, Cooma FC announced a partnership with club Brindabella Blues FC. The partnership saw Brindabella Blues administer and run the U12, U14, U16 and U18 NPL programs out of Brindabella's home at Calwell District Playing Fields while the U20 and senior NPL programs remain based in Cooma with Cooma FC. At the time the NPL games were split between Calwell playing fields and Nijong, with U12, U14 and U16 playing at Calwell and U18, U20 and first grade playing at Nijong Oval Cooma, Capital Football Board insisted that the two clubs must form a new entity, the two clubs agreed to form Tigers FC as their NPL club.

In 2016, the Tigers fell short of winning the league title by three points as Canberra Olympic claimed the premiership. In the finals series Cooma lost the major semi-final to Olympic 5–3 on penalties after the two sides drew 2–2 after 120 minutes. The Tigers had looked certain to advance to the grand final as they headed into the final minutes of the match 2–1 up but a late goal by Colombian striker Phillippe Bernabo-Madrid sent the match into extra time. Cooma advanced to the preliminary final against Canberra FC but a number of injuries in the lead up to the match saw a depleted Tigers lose the match 1–5 and end the club's season. Cooma also missed out on reaching the round of 32 of the FFA Cup in 2016 when they lost the Capital Football Federation Cup final to Olympic 1–3 at Deakin Stadium on 18 June 2016.

Staff

Club management

Club identity

Club colours

Cooma FC has traditionally used yellow and black, including at a community level.

Club Grounds
Their home ground is Nijong Oval, located in the middle of Cooma.

Honours
Womens State League 2
Premiers (1): 2014
Womens State League 3
Premiers (1): 2021
Champions (1):2021 (finals cancelled due to COVID pandemic)
Mens State League 1
Premiers (1): 2018
Mens State League 2
Premiers (1): 2016

Capital Football Federation Cup
 Runner-up (5): 2005, 2006, 2012, 2013, 2016 Winners 2019 Federation Cup

Notes

References

External links

 Official website
 Capital Football home
 NPL Capital Football home

National Premier Leagues clubs
Soccer clubs in New South Wales
Association football clubs established in 1952
1952 establishments in Australia